Sarvu (also Romanized as Sarvū; also known as Sarv) is a village in Kuhak Rural District, in the Central District of Jahrom County, Fars Province, Iran. At the 2006 census, its population was 138, in 33 families.

References 

Populated places in Jahrom County